William, Bill, or Billy Whelan may refer to:

 William Whelan (surgeon) (1808–1865), Chief of the US Bureau of Medicine and Surgery
 W. J. Whelan (union leader) (1887–1960), Irish union leader
 Billy Whelan (Scottish footballer) (1906–1982), Scottish footballer
 William Joseph Whelan (1924–2021), American biochemist, Fellow of the Royal Society
 Billy Whelan (1935–1958), Irish footballer
 Bill Whelan (born 1950), Irish musician